The Beatles: The Biography is the name of a 2005 biography of the 1960s rock band The Beatles written by Bob Spitz. It was first published by Little, Brown and Company on November 1, 2005.

Writing and research
The Beatles: The Biography was among the first major Beatles biographies published after the band's Anthology multimedia project, which culminated in the publication of an authorized book in 2000. With his biography, Spitz sought to present a fresh interpretation of the Beatles' story and re-evalute aspects of the band's career.

Spitz spent six years working on the book. He said he carried out 650 interviews during that time and received cooperation from Paul McCartney and George Harrison (who died in 2001). He also interviewed people whose story had not been heard in the context of the Beatles' history, while drawing from private tapes made by John Lennon before his death in 1980. Spitz's personal insights and editorialization feature throughout the book.

Reviews
"Bob Spitz's beautifully written chronicle breathes new life into the familiar story of the Liverpool boys who conquered the world and became, according to a recent Variety poll, the most influential entertainers of the past century. The author's passion for his subject, and for every nuance of every scene, electrifies even the most familiar moments in the legend ... The scene-by-scene particulars are fascinating; for example, the description of Ringo meticulously rolling up towels to seal the threshold under the door of a room at the Delmonico Hotel in New York the night in 1964 when they met Bob Dylan and Dylan introduced them to marijuana. "An unusually gregarious Dylan was delighted by the Beatles' curiosity and readiness to experiment," Spitz writes. "They got right in the groove, which relaxed the recalcitrant bard, who lit joint after joint, fanning the fateful flame." The chapter ends: "Nothing would ever be the same again." —The New York Times

"With this massive opus, veteran music journalist Spitz (Dylan: A Biography) tells the definitive story of the band that sparked a cultural revolution. Calling on books, articles, radio programs and primary interviews, Spitz follows the band from each member's family origins in working-class Liverpool to the band's agonizing final days. Spitz's unflinching biography reveals that not only did the Beatles pioneer a new era of rock but they also were on the cutting edge of rock star excess, from their 1961 amphetamine-fueled sets in the clubs of Hamburg to their eventual appetites for stronger drugs, including marijuana, LSD, cocaine and, eventually for John Lennon, heroin ... Spitz writes economically, and with flair, letting the facts and characters speak for themselves. In doing so, he captures an ironic sadness that accompanied the Beatles' runaway success—how their dreams of stardom, once realized, became a prison, forcing the band to spend large parts of their youth in hotel rooms to avoid mobs and to stage elaborate escapes from literally life-threatening situations after appearances. As with all great history writing, Spitz both captures a moment in time and humanizes his subjects." —Publishers Weekly (starred review)

Reception
The Beatles: The Biography received generally favorable reviews, particularly from The New York Times and The Washington Post. However, some journalists and fans of the band identified factual errors throughout the book. Spitz has generally been bitter towards his critics. When one of the editors of Daytrippin′, a Beatles fanzine, sent the author a list of incorrect facts in his book, Spitz replied: "You need an enema. Really! Do something useful with your life."

Spitz's book was the first major Beatles biography to be published after the emergence of internet forums, fan sites and online publications—an environment that ensured the scrutiny it received was widespread and influential. Beatles historian Erin Torkelson Weber comments that the book's standing suffered as a result of its basic factual errors, and its credibility as a historical work was further diminished by the author's tendency towards editorialization, which revealed a clear disapproval of Lennon's relationship with Yoko Ono. According to Weber, Jonathan Gould's 2007 Beatles biography, Can't Buy Me Love, proved more impressive to "knowledgeable readers".

References

2005 non-fiction books
Books about the Beatles
British biographies
Little, Brown and Company books
Biographies about musicians